Aa Dekhen Zara is a 2009 Indian Hindi-language science fiction thriller film written by Sheershak Anand , starring Neil Nitin Mukesh, who plays a photo journalist, and Bipasha Basu, as a disc jockey. The film is the directorial debut of Jehangir Surti.

Plot
Ray Acharya (Neil Nitin Mukesh), a struggling photographer, has nothing going for him. He inherits a special camera from his grandfather, who was a scientist. His life then changes in a way that he could not have imagined in his wildest dreams.

The photographs produced by the camera predict the future. Ray uses the camera to obtain winning lottery numbers, winning horses, and also stock prices. His life becomes one big roller coaster ride that takes him from rags to riches and also helps him meet the love of his life, Simi (Bipasha Basu), a DJ with a mind of her own

However, Captain (Rahul Dev) finds out and chases Ray to get the camera for himself. Security authorities also chase Ray as they are aware that Ray's grandfather was trying to create a camera that can predict the future. The chase leads them to Bangkok, where the climax unfolds.

Cast

Production
The movie was initially known as Freeze. But in an interview, Vikram Rajani, the executive director of Eros International, said, "What is Freeze? The movie was always called Aa Dekhen Zara. I do not know how people called the movie Freeze. That was just a working title we had in mind. We have the title Aa Dekhen Zara registered long time back".

Bipasha Basu performed opposite Neil Mukesh for the first time with this film. Recent reports say that Neil convinced Bipasha to sing with him the title track, "Aa Dekhe Zara". Stylist Rakhi Parekh Patil worked on Bipasha Basu's look for the movie.

Box office
The film did moderate business because of a feud between multiplexes owners and the producers. It had an average opening in the first week. The collections started to drop in the second week because of other films with similar themes releasing at the same time (8 x 10 Tasveer, Kal Kissne Dekha). The movie grossed Rs  worldwide. The film was declared an average grosser.

Music

The song "Aa Dekhen Zara" is a modern-day remix version of the popular dance number from the Sanjay Dutt and Tina Munim's film Rocky, which was released in 1981. The makers of Aa Dekhen Zara obtained the rights for this original R.D. Burman number and gave the song a modern-day flavor. Gaurav Dasgupta was the man behind this remix number which also supposedly features Bipasha. The song "Paisa Hai Power" is a remake of "The Power" by Snap!.

Tracks

References

External links
 Official Eros Entertainment Website for Aa Dekhen Zara
 

2009 films
Films set in Mumbai
2000s Hindi-language films
2000s science fiction thriller films
Films scored by Gaurav Dasgupta
Films featuring songs by Pritam
2000s mystery thriller films
Cyberpunk films
Films shot in Bangkok
Indian mystery thriller films
Indian science fiction thriller films